Acalypta cooleyi, or Cooley's tingid, is a species of lace bug in the family Tingidae. It is found in Europe and Northern Asia (excluding China), North America, and Southern Asia.

References

Further reading

 
 
 
 
 
 
 
 
 
 
 

Tingidae
Articles created by Qbugbot
Insects described in 1917